The 73rd Delaware General Assembly was a meeting of the legislative branch of the state government, consisting of the Delaware Senate and the Delaware House of Representatives. Elections were held the first Tuesday after November 1 and terms began on the first Tuesday in January. It met in Dover, Delaware, convening January 3, 1865, two weeks before the beginning of the third and fourth year of the administration of Governor William Cannon. He died March 1, 1865, and nearly all the time was covered by Gove Saulsbury.

The apportionment of seats was permanently assigned to three senators and seven representatives for each of the three counties. Population of the county did not affect the number of delegates. Both chambers had a Democratic majority.

Leadership

Senate
Gove Saulsbury, Kent County
William Hitch, Sussex County

House of Representatives
Shephard P. Houston, Sussex County

Members

Senate
Senators were elected by the public for a four-year term, some elected each two year.

House of Representative
Representatives were elected by the public for a term, every two years.

References

Places with more information
Delaware Historical Society; website; 505 North Market Street, Wilmington, Delaware 19801; (302) 655-7161
University of Delaware; Library website; 181 South College Avenue, Newark, Delaware 19717; (302) 831-2965

7 073
1860s in Delaware